This article lists the winners and nominees for the NAACP Image Award for Outstanding Actor in a Daytime Drama Series. The award was given every year since the 1993 ceremony and later retired in 2015. Kristoff St. John holds the record for most wins in this category with 11.

Winners and nominees
Winners are listed first and highlighted in bold.

1990s

2000s

2010s

Multiple wins and nominations

Wins

 11 wins
 Kristoff St. John

 7 wins
 Shemar Moore

Nominations

 18 nominations
 Kristoff St. John

 9 nominations
 Shemar Moore

 7 nominations
 Bryton James
 Nathan Purdee

 5 nominations
 James Reynolds

 4 nominations
 Keith Hamilton Cobb
 Aaron D. Spears
 Timothy Stickney

 3 nominations
 Texas Battle
 Michael B. Jordan
 Joseph C. Phillips
 Cornelius Smith Jr.
 Darnell Williams

 2 nominations
 Peter Parros
 Antonio Sabato Jr.
 Rodney Saulsberry
 Mathew St. Patrick

References

NAACP Image Awards
Television awards for Best Actor